The 2nd Antalya Golden Orange Film Festival was held from May 24 to June 4, 1965, in Antalya, Turkey. Golden Oranges were awarded in thirteen categories to the seven Turkish films made in the preceding year which were selected to compete in the festival's National Feature Film Competition.

National Feature Film Competition

Golden Orange Awards 
The National Feature Film Competition Jury, headed by Nejat Duru, awarded Golden Oranges in twelve categories.
1st Best Film: Love and Hate directed by Turgut Demirağ
2nd Best Film: Keshanli Ali's Epic directed by Atıf Yılmaz
3rd Best Film: Those Awaking in the Dark directed by Ertem Göreç
Best Director: Atıf Yılmaz for Keshanli Ali's Epic
Best Screenplay: Vedat Türkali for Those Awaking in the Dark
Best Cinematography: Gani Turanlı for Love and Hate
Best Original Music: Nedim Otyam for Those Awaking in the Dark
Best Actress: Fatma Girik for Keshanli Ali's Epic
Best Actor: Fikret Hakan for Keshanli Ali's Epic
Best Supporting Actress: Aliye Rona for We are all Brothers and Sisters
Best Supporting Actor: Erol Taş for Beyond the Walls
Best Studio:Acar Film Studio

Official Selection 
Six Turkish films made in the preceding year were selected to compete in the festival's National Feature Film Competition.
 Love and Hate directed by Turgut Demirağ
 Keshanli Ali's Epic directed by Atıf Yılmaz
 Those Awaking in the Dark directed by Ertem Göreç
 We are all Brothers and Sisters directed by Ülkü Erakalın
 Beyond the Walls directed by Orhan Elmas
 Erkek Ali directed by Atıf Yılmaz
 Girls of Istanbul directed by Halit Refiğ

National Short Film Competition

Golden Orange Awards 
Best Short Film: A Drop of Water's Story directed by Behlül Dal

See also 
 1965 in film

External links
  for the festival

References

Antalya Golden Orange Film Festival
Antalya Golden Orange Film Festival
Antalya Golden Orange Film Festival